Martin Toml (born 25 March 1996) is a Czech professional footballer who currently plays for ViOn Zlaté Moravce as a centre-back.

References

External links
 FC ViOn Zlaté Moravce official club profile 
 
 Futbalnet profile 
 

1996 births
Living people
Czech footballers
Association football defenders
AC Sparta Prague players
FC Sellier & Bellot Vlašim players
FK Mladá Boleslav players
MFK Karviná players
FC Silon Táborsko players
FK Viktoria Žižkov players
FK Pardubice players
FC ViOn Zlaté Moravce players
Czech First League players
Slovak Super Liga players
Expatriate footballers in Slovakia
People from Brandýs nad Labem-Stará Boleslav